Klance is a small village northwest of Dane in the Municipality of Loška Dolina in the Inner Carniola region of Slovenia.

History
Klance was a hamlet of Dane until 1986, when it was separated and made a village in its own right.

Church

The local church, built in a forest above the settlement, is dedicated to Saint Pancras and belong to the Parish of Stari Trg. It was first mentioned in written documents dating to 1526. The belfry was built in 1647.

References

External links 

Klance on Geopedia

Populated places in the Municipality of Loška Dolina